Taça das Favelas is a football championship held by Central Única das Favelas, in Brazil, since 2011. It is considered the biggest tournament between favelas in the world.

In 2019, the women's modality the Casa Verde team won in a dispute against Paraisópolis. In the same year, the men's modality Complexo Parque Santo Antônio won the championship defeating Favelas 1010. The games took place at the Pacaembu Stadium, in São Paulo. The competition is part of the official calendar of the Municipality of São Paulo. Before the dispute in São Paulo, the Taça das Favelas was held in 12 Brazilian cities.

References

External links 
 Official Website

Football leagues in Brazil
Sports leagues in Brazil